Blue Lake / Warwar (The Blue Lake) is a large, monomictic, crater lake located in a dormant volcanic maar associated with the Mount Gambier maar complex. The lake is situated near  in the Limestone Coast region of South Australia, and is one of four volcanic crater lakes originally on Mount Gambier maar. Of the four lakes, only two remain, the other one being Valley Lake / Ketla Malpi; the other two, Leg of Mutton Lake / Yatton Loo and Brownes Lake / Kroweratwari, have dried up as the water table has dropped.

History
Conflicting dates have been estimated for the last eruption of the volcano: of 4,300 years ago, of 28,000 years ago, and a little before 6,000 years ago. If the youngest date is correct, this could be the most recent volcanic eruption on the Australian mainland.

The Boandik (or Bungandidj) people occupied the area before the colonisation of South Australia.

Description

Blue Lake / Warwar is one of four lakes in the extinct volcano complex. Sites of cultural significance to the Boandik people were assigned dual names by the City of Mount Gambier in February 2022, and the renaming included the four lakes in the Bungandidj language. These are as follows:
Blue Lake / Warwar, meaning "crow country"
Leg of Mutton Lake / Yatton Loo
Brownes Lake / Kroweratwari, meaning "emus, [or] their tracks"
Valley Lake / Ketla Malpi, meaning "sacred talking tree"

The crater rim measures , but the lake itself measures . The Blue Lake supplies the town with drinking water.

Browne's Lake / Kroweratwari (sometimes spelt Browns Lake)  dried up in the 1980s, and is now a picnic spot.

There is a  road and walking track around the circumference of Blue Lake / Warwar, with an underpass between it and Leg of Mutton Lake / Yatton Loo.

Annual colour change

Each November, the lake turns to a deep turquoise colour, gradually returning to a duller blue colour in late February to March. This results in scatter of the blue wavelengths of sunlight. During winter, the lake becomes well mixed, and recent research indicates that during this phase of the colour cycle, the lake is somewhat murkier due to the redistribution of tannins and calcium carbonate particles throughout the lake. Solar elevation has also been found to influence the perceived colour of the lake. The movement of planktonic life forms within the lake during the seasons and during the day may additionally play a part in the colour change.

Studies
Major diving exploration of the lake first occurred in 1985. Cave diver Peter Horne conducted temperature and visibility studies and made discoveries of a freshwater sponge species and other invertebrates. In 2008, permission was granted by SA Water for another diving exploration of the central and deepest parts of the lake.

Gordon's leap

In July 1865, Adam Lindsay Gordon performed the daring riding feat known as Gordon's Leap on the edge of the Blue Lake. A commemorative obelisk erected there has an inscription which reads:
This obelisk was erected as a memorial to the famous Australian poet. From near this spot in July, 1865, Gordon made his famed leap on horseback over an old post and rail guard fence onto a narrow ledge overlooking the Blue Lake and jumped back again onto the roadway. The foundation stone of the Gordon Memorial Obelisk was laid on 8th July 1887

Gallery

See also

 List of lakes of South Australia

References

Further reading
 Emeny, J., Turner, G., Turoczy, N.J. and Stagnitti, F. (2006) The influence of weather and solar elevation on perceived colour of Blue Lake, Mount Gambier, South Australia. Transactions of the Royal Society of South Australia. 130(1) 101–108.
 Horne, P. (1985) Report on an exploratory study of the underwater environment and biology of the Blue Lake, Mount Gambier, South Australia 21–25 January 1985 and subsequent study reports July 1985, 1987, 1989, 1991 and 2008 
 Sheard, M.J. (1978) Geological History of the Mount Gambier Volcanic Complex, Southeast South Australia. Transcript from Royal Society of South Australia 102(5), Aug. 1978.
 Telfer, A. (2000) Identification of processes regulating the colour and colour change in an oligotrophic, hardwater, groundwater-fed lake, Blue Lake, Mount Gambier, South Australia. Lakes and Reservoirs: Research and Management. 5 161–176.
 Turoczy, N.J. (2002) Calcium chemistry of Blue Lake, Mt Gambier, Australia, and relevance to remarkable seasonal colour changes. Archiv für Hydrobiologia. 156 (1) 1–9.

Volcanic crater lakes
Dormant volcanoes
Lakes of South Australia
Maars of Australia
Volcanoes of South Australia
Limestone Coast